Isaković is a Bosniak and Serb patronymic surname derived from a masculine given name Isak (Isaac). It may refer to:
 
Aladin Isaković (born 1985), Bosnian footballer
Alija Isaković (1932–1997), writer
Antonije Isaković (1923–2002), writer
Boris Isaković (born 1966), actor
Branko Isaković (born 1958), musician
Mile Isaković (born 1958), handball player
Mirjana Isaković (born 1936), artist
Sara Isaković (1988), swimmer
Vuk Isaković (1696–1759), military commander

Bosnian surnames
Serbian surnames
Patronymic surnames
Surnames from given names